"Stranger in My House" is a song recorded by Canadian singer Tamia. It was written by Shae Jones and frequent collaborator Shep Crawford and produced by the latter. Initially helmed for fellow R&B singer Toni Braxton, it was left unused and later recorded by Tamia for her second studio album, A Nu Day (2000). Inspired by the surprise ending of the supernatural thriller film The Sixth Sense (1999), the strings-led, dramatic contemporary R&B ballad is about a woman who is confused with her partner's recent change in behavior and goes into denial about it.

The song was released as the album's second single in February 2001. Upon its release, it received a positive reception from music critics who complimented the singer for her vocal performance, and reached number 10 on the US Billboard Hot 100, becoming Tamia's first top ten hit on the chart. "Stranger in My House" also peaked at number three on Billboards Hot R&B/Hip-Hop Songs, while reaching the top spot on the Dance Club Songs chart. An accompanying music video, directed by Paul Hunter, features Tamia performing in an indoor pool.

Background
"Stranger in My House" was written by singer Shae Jones and producer Shep Crawford. Initially penned with fellow R&B singer Toni Braxton in mind, it was conceived after a writer’s block during which Crawford failed to come up with a song for Braxton. He was eventually inspired to resume work after watching the supernatural psychological thriller film The Sixth Sense (1999) and its surprise ending which encouraged him to write a song "that has a twist," leading to the lyrics "could it be that the stranger is me / Have I changed so drastically / And you remained the same." However, when the ballad was offered to Braxton for recording, her record company LaFace Records rejected it.

Left unused, "Stranger in My House" was one out of several records Crawford played for Tamia when Elektra Records consulted him to work with her on her second album A Nu Day (2000). The singer reportedly "loved" the record. However, it was not until after a meeting with Elektra head Sylvia Rhone that "Stranger in My House" was bought for Tamia to record. Tracking of the song took place at both the Paramount Studios in Hollywood and The Enterprise Studios in Burbank, and was overseen by Anne Catalino, and Jamie Seyberth. Jimmy "Professa" Russell played the guitar, while backing vocals were provided by Jones. Mixing was handled by Kevin Davis. In 2017, Tamia cited "Stranger in My House" as one of her favorite songs within her discography, telling: "‘Stranger in My House’ was a long time ago, but I love performing that song [...] I can’t wait to get to it in a show. So that’s what I compare [any new material] to."

Release and reception

"Stranger in My House" received favorable reviews from music critics. In his review for parent album A Nu Day, Chuck Taylor from Billboard called the song "gut-wrenching" and "a surefire crossover hit and should be the album's second (or third) single." The song debuted on the US Billboard Hot 100 at number 79 for the chart dated January 13, 2001. Over the course of its first thirteen weeks on the chart, during which it was charting based solely on airplay and sales of its vinyl 12-inch single, the song had reached an initial peak of number 38. Following its retail release in the more popular CD single format, it jumped from number 53 to its peak of number 10 for the chart dated April 14, 2001, having sold 48,500 copies that week. It also jumped from number 19 to its peak of number 3 on the Hot R&B/Hip-Hop Singles & Tracks chart the same week, having previously reached as high as number 9. "Stranger in My House" was also a success in dance clubs, topping the Billboard Hot Dance Club Play chart for the issue dated March 3, 2001.

Music video
The music video for "Stranger in My House" was filmed by Paul Hunter. It marked his third collaboration with Tamia following their work on ""Make Tonight Beautiful" and "Imagination."

Track listings

Notes
 denotes co-producer
 denotes additional producer
Sample credits
"Stranger in My House (So So Def Remix)" contains a sample of "The Bridge" performed by MC Shan.

Credits and personnel 
Credits adapted from the liner notes of A Nu Day.

Backing vocals – Shae V. Jones
Drum programming, keyboards, producer – Anthony "Shep" Crawford
Guitar – Professa
Mixing – Kevin Davis
Recording – Anne Catalino
Tracking – Anne Catalino, Jamie Seyberth

Charts

Weekly charts

Year-end charts

References

2000 songs
Tamia songs
Songs written by Shep Crawford
2001 singles
Elektra Records singles
Songs written by Shae Jones
Contemporary R&B ballads
2000s ballads